The Peace River is a  river in Canada that originates in the Rocky Mountains of northern British Columbia and flows to the northeast through northern Alberta. The Peace River joins the Athabasca River in the Peace-Athabasca Delta to form the Slave River, a tributary of the Mackenzie River. The Finlay River, the main headwater of the Peace River, is regarded as the ultimate source of the Mackenzie River. The combined Finlay–Peace–Slave–Mackenzie river system is the 13th longest river system in the world.

History 
The regions along the river are the traditional home of the Dane-zaa people, called the Beaver by the Europeans. The fur trader Peter Pond is believed to have visited the river in 1785. In 1788 Charles Boyer of the North West Company established a fur trading post at the river's junction with the Boyer River.

In 1792 and 1793, the explorer Alexander Mackenzie travelled up the river to the Continental Divide. Mackenzie referred to the river as Unjegah, from the Dane-zaa meaning "large river."

The decades of hostilities between the Dane-zaa and the Cree, (in which the Cree dominated the Dane-zaa), ended in 1781 when a smallpox epidemic decimated the Cree. The Treaty of the Peace was celebrated by the smoking of a ceremonial pipe. The treaty made the Peace River a border, with the Dane-zaa to the North and the Cree to the South.

In 1794, a fur trading post was built on the Peace River at Fort St. John; it was the first settlement established on the British Columbia mainland by the European settler population.

Post-settlement 

The rich soils of the Peace River valley in Alberta have been producing wheat crops since the late 19th century. In the early 21st century, the BC Grain Producers Association was researching the productivity of wheat and other grain crops near Dawson Creek. The Peace River region is also an important centre of oil and natural gas production. There are also pulp and paper plants along the river in Alberta and British Columbia.

The Peace River has two navigable sections, separated by the Vermilion Chutes, near Fort Vermilion.
The first steam-powered vessel to navigate the Peace River was the Grahame, a Hudson's Bay Company vessel built at Fort Chipewyan, on Lake Athabasca.  Brothers of the Oblate Order of Mary Immaculate built the St. Charles to navigate the upper reaches of the River, from Fort Vermilion to Hudson's Hope.  Approximately a dozen vessels were to navigate the river.  Most of the early vessels were wood-burning steamships, fueled by wood cut from the river's shore.  The last cargo vessel was the Watson's Lake, retired in 1952.

Hydroelectric development 
Hydroelectric development began on the Peace River in 1968 and continues to be an important source of renewable energy for British Columbia's main electricity provider, BC Hydro. The river’s first dam, the W. A. C. Bennett Dam, was completed in 1968 and is British Columbia's largest dam and the third-largest hydroelectric facility in Canada. It supplies over 30% of British Columbia's total power demand. Engineers took advantage of the W. A. C. Bennet Dam's large reservoir storage to further develop the river with the Peace Canyon Dam opened in 1980. The Site C dam is under construction and scheduled to be finished in 2025; it will further benefit from the upstream dams and generate additional electrical capacity to meet British Columbia's growing demand for green energy and reduce the carbon footprint of residents.  both the Alberta government and private producers were studying the possibility of hydroelectric development on the Alberta stretch of the river with one run-of-the-river project currently being proposed.

Geography

Course

A large man-made lake, Williston Lake, has been formed on the upper reaches by the construction of the W. A. C. Bennett Dam for hydroelectric power generation. Prior to its flooding, the confluence of the Finlay and Parsnip Rivers at Finlay Forks was distinct. A half mile east of that location were the half-mile long Finlay Rapids and a further seven miles east is the Peace Pass, which separates the Muskwa Ranges and the Hart Ranges of the Canadian Rockies. 

The only river cutting completely through the Rockies, it nowadays flows into Dinosaur Lake, a reservoir for the Peace Canyon Dam. After the dams, the river flows east into Alberta and then continues north and east into the Peace-Athabasca Delta in Wood Buffalo National Park, at the western end of Lake Athabasca. Water from the delta flows into the Slave River east of Peace Point and reaches the Arctic Ocean via the Great Slave Lake and Mackenzie River.

Communities

Communities located directly on the river include:
Hudson's Hope, British Columbia
Taylor, British Columbia
Peace River, Alberta
Fort Vermilion, Alberta

Many provincial parks and wildland reserves are established on the river, such as Butler Ridge Provincial Park, Taylor Landing Provincial Park, Beatton River Provincial Park, Peace River Corridor Provincial Park in British Columbia and Dunvegan Provincial Park, Dunvegan West Wildland Provincial Park, Peace River Wildland Provincial Park, Greene Valley Provincial Park, Notikewin Provincial Park, Wood Buffalo National Park in Alberta.

A few Indian reserves are also located on the river banks, among them Beaver Ranch 163, John D'Or Prairie 215, Fox Lake 162, Peace Point 222 and Devil's Gate 220.

Tributaries

Tributaries of the Peace River include:

Williston Lake
Finlay River
Omineca River
Ingenika River
Ospika River
Parsnip River
Manson River
Nation River
Clearwater Creek
Nabesche River
Carbon Creek

Northeastern British Columbia
Gething Creek, Moosbar Creek, Johnson Creek, Starfish Creek, Bullrun Creek, Portage Creek, Maurice Creek, Lynx Creek, Farrell Creek
Halfway River
Cache Creek, Wilder Creek, Tea Creek
Moberly River
Pine River
Eight Mile Creek
Beatton River
Doig River
Blueberry River
Golata Creek, Mica Creek
Kiskatinaw River
Alces River

Alberta
Moonlight Creek
Pouce Coupe River
Clear River
Sneddon Creek
Montagneuse River
Fourth Creek, Hamelin Creek
Ksituan River
Hines Creek, Dunvegan Creek, Boucher Creek
Leith River (Little Burnt River)
Saddle River (Burnt River)
Griffin Creek, Mcallister Creek, Strong Creek
Smoky River
Heart River
Pat's Creek, Three Creeks, Carmon Creek
Whitemud River
Cadotte River
Buchanan Creek, Keppler Creek
Notikewin River
Scully Creek
Wolverine River
Buffalo River
Keg River
Steephill Creek
Boyer River
Caribou River
Beaver Ranch Creek
Wabasca River
Lawrence River
Mikkwa River (Little Red River)
Dummy Creek, Waldo Creek
Pakwanutik River
Garden Creek, Drolet Creek, Swan River, Vermilion River, Trident Creek, Portage River
Jackfish River
Jodoin Creek
Claire River

Lake Claire
Lake Claire
Birch River
McIvor River
Mamawi Lake
Baril River
Chenal Des Quatre Fourches
Revolution Coupe
Scow Channel

See also

List of rivers of Alberta
List of rivers of British Columbia
List of longest rivers of Canada
Steamboats of the Peace River

Footnotes

References

 http://pgnewspapers.pgpl.ca/fedora/repository

External links

Discover The Peace Country

Rivers of Alberta
Rivers of British Columbia
Rivers of the Canadian Rockies
Peace River Country
Peace River Regional District